Khaitan Stadium (also called Nasser Al Osaimy Stadium) is a multi-use stadium in Kuwait.  It is currently used mostly for football matches and is the home stadium of Khaitan Sporting Club.  The stadium holds 11,000 people.

External links
Stadium information

References

Football venues in Kuwait